Sparganothina anopla is a species of moth of the family Tortricidae. It is found in Veracruz, Mexico. It was first described by Bernard Landry in 2001.

References

Moths described in 2001
Sparganothini